Bartók usually refers to Béla Bartók, Hungarian composer.

Bartok may also refer to:

 Bartok (surname), other people with the name
 Bartok (compiler), an advanced compiler being developed by Microsoft Research
 Bartok (card game)
 Bartok (film), a 1964 television film
 Bartok, a fictional bat in the movies Anastasia and its prequel Bartok the Magnificent
 Béla Bartók Boulevard, or Bartók for short, a major thoroughfare in Újbuda, Budapest, the continuation of the Small Boulevard on the Buda side

See also
 Bartók Glacier, an Antarctic glacier
 
 
 Bartek (disambiguation)